Vendula Přibylová (born 23 March 1996) is a Czech ice hockey player and member of the Czech national team, currently playing in the Swedish Women's Hockey League (SDHL) with MoDo Hockey Dam. Her college ice hockey career was played with the Maine Black Bears women's ice hockey program in the Hockey East (WHEA) conference of the NCAA Division I during 2016 to 2020.

International career
Přibylová has represented the Czech Republic at the IIHF Women's World Championships in 2013, 2016, 2017, 2019, and 2021, and at the Division I A tournaments in 2012, 2014, and 2015. As a junior player with the Czech national under-18 team, she participated in the IIHF U18 Women's World Championships in 2012, 2013, and 2014, winning a bronze medal at the 2013 tournament.

References

External links
 
 Vendula Přibylová at Hokej.cz 

1996 births
Living people
AIK Hockey Dam players
Czech expatriate ice hockey players in Sweden
Czech expatriate ice hockey players in the United States
Czech women's ice hockey forwards
Ice hockey players at the 2022 Winter Olympics
Maine Black Bears women's ice hockey players
Modo Hockey Dam players
Olympic ice hockey players of the Czech Republic
Sportspeople from Olomouc